BETA Cargo (Brazilian Express Transportes Aéreos) was a cargo airline based in Brazil. It operated international cargo charters in the Americas. Its main base was Guarulhos International Airport, São Paulo.

History

The airline was established in 1990 as Brasair Transportes Aéreos. On July 10, 2012 Beta lost its operational license.

Fleet

Accidents and incidents
 On October 23, 2004 a BETA Boeing 707 on a Cargo flight from Manaus-Eduardo Gomes International Airport, Brazil to São Paulo-Guarulhos International Airport, Brazil aborted take-off from Manaus due to a "loud noise". The aircraft afterwards started tilting to the right. It appeared the landing gear ruptured the right wing. The 37-year-old aircraft (registration PP-BSE) was written off.

See also
List of defunct airlines of Brazil

References

External links
BETA Cargo
Brazilian Express

Defunct airlines of Brazil
Airlines established in 1990
Airlines disestablished in 2012
Defunct cargo airlines